New York's 91st State Assembly district is one of the 150 districts in the New York State Assembly. It has been represented by Steven Otis since 2013.

Geography
District 91 is in Westchester County. It includes the towns of Larchmont, Mamaroneck, Rye, Rye Brook, Port Chester, and portions of New Rochelle.

Recent election results

2022

2020

2018

2016

2014

2012

References 

91
Westchester County, New York